The 2012 winners of the Torneo di Viareggio (in English, the Viareggio Tournament, officially the Viareggio Cup World Football Tournament Coppa Carnevale), the annual youth football tournament held in Viareggio, Tuscany, are listed below.

Format 

The 48 teams are seeded in 12 pools, split up into 6-pool groups. Each team from a pool meets the others in a single tie. The winning club from each pool and two best runners-up from both group A and group B progress to the final knockout stage. All matches in the final rounds are single tie. The Round of 16 after envisions penalties and no extra time, while the rest of the final round matches include 30 minutes extra time and penalties to be played if the draw between teams still holds.

Participating teams
Italian teams

  Arzanese
  Atalanta
  Cesena
  A.S.D. Città di Marino
  Empoli
  Fiorentina
  Genoa
  Inter Milan
  Juventus
  Lazio
  Milan
  Modena
  Napoli
  Palermo
  Parma
  Poggibonsi
  Serie D Representatives
  Reggina
  Roma
  Sambenedettese
  Sampdoria
  Sassuolo
  Siena
  Spezia
  Torino
  Varese
  Viareggio
  Vicenza
  Entella

European teams

  Anderlecht
  Bruges
  Dukla Prague
  Honvéd
  Nordsjaelland
  Spartak Moscow
  Stabaek

Asian teams

  Aspire
  Paxtakor

American teams

  L.I.A.C. New York
  Guaraní Asunción
  Nacional Asunción
  Grêmio Osasco
  Juventude
  Olé Brasil
  Santos Laguna
  Pumas
  Wanderers

Oceanian teams
  APIA Leichhardt

Group stage

Group A

Pool 1

Pool 2

Pool 3

Pool 4

Pool 5

Pool 6

Group B

Pool 7

Pool 8

Pool 9

Pool 10

Pool 11

Pool 12

Final Rounds

Champions

Top goal scorers 

6 goals
  Riccardo Improta ( Genoa)

4 goals

  Gianmario Comi ( Milan)
  Daniele Grandi ( Atalanta)
  Nichlas Rohde ( Nordsjaelland)
  Maxi Rodríguez ( Wanderers)

Notes

External links
Official Site (Italian)
Results on RSSSF.COM

2012
2011–12 in Italian football
2011–12 in European football
2011–12 in CONCACAF football
2012 in South American football
2012 in Asian football
2012 in African football